is a Japanese short track speed skater. She competed at the 1988, 1992, 1998, 2002 and the 2006 Winter Olympics.

References

External links
 

1971 births
Living people
Japanese female short track speed skaters
Olympic short track speed skaters of Japan
Short track speed skaters at the 1988 Winter Olympics
Short track speed skaters at the 1992 Winter Olympics
Short track speed skaters at the 1998 Winter Olympics
Short track speed skaters at the 2002 Winter Olympics
Short track speed skaters at the 2006 Winter Olympics
Sportspeople from Fukuoka (city)
20th-century Japanese women
21st-century Japanese women